= Equal Employment Opportunity Commission v. United Health Programs of America =

Violation of US Civil Rights legal case

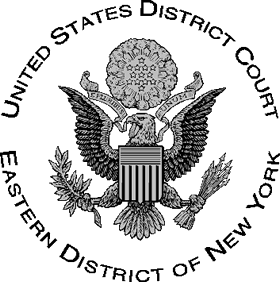
- Court: United States District Court for the Eastern District of New York
- Full case name: Equal Employment Opportunity Commission, plaintiffs, Elizabeth Ontaneda, Francine Pennisi, and Faith Pabon v. United Health Programs of American Inc. and Cost Containment Group Inc.

Equal Employment Opportunity Commission v. United Health Programs of America is a case in the United States District Court for the Eastern District of New York. The court ruled that an employer's imposition of an "Onionhead" or "Harnessing Happiness" system of beliefs on employees constituted a religions imposition in violation of Title VII of the Civil Rights Act of 1964.
